The 1983 NAIA Division II football season, as part of the 1983 college football season in the United States and the 28th season of college football sponsored by the NAIA, was the 14th season of play of the NAIA's lower division for football.

The season was played from August to November 1983 and culminated in the 1983 NAIA Division II Football National Championship, played at the Lincoln Bowl near the campus of Pacific Lutheran University in Tacoma, Washington.

Northwestern (IA) defeated Pacific Lutheran in the championship game, 25–21, to win their second NAIA national title (and first since 1973).

Conference standings

Conference champions

Postseason

See also
 1983 NAIA Division I football season
 1983 NCAA Division I-A football season
 1983 NCAA Division I-AA football season
 1983 NCAA Division II football season
 1983 NCAA Division III football season

References

 
NAIA Football National Championship